National Professional Soccer League may refer to either of two defunct professional soccer leagues:

National Professional Soccer League (1967), merged with the United Soccer Association to form the North American Soccer League 
National Professional Soccer League (South Africa), a South African soccer league from 1971 to 1995
National Professional Soccer League (1984–2001), originally the American Indoor Soccer Association